XEEG-AM is a radio station on 1280 AM in Puebla, Puebla, Mexico.

History
XEEG received its concession on November 26, 1970. It was located in Panzacola, Tlaxcala, and Ramón Bojalil y Bojalil was the concessionaire until 1980.

In the 1980s, XEEG moved to Puebla from Panzacola, which borders the Tlaxcala-Puebla state line.

On April 11, 2018, the Federal Telecommunications Institute approved the migration of XEEG to FM as XHEG-FM 92.1, but the station did not pay the fee to migrate. The frequency was instead awarded in April 2018 for XEPUE-AM to migrate as XHPUE-FM, which launched in August 2018.

In April 2021, NTR acquired the ABC Radio network from OEM. In 2022, as with other ABC Radio stations, the station changed its name to "Radio Cañón"

References

Mass media in Puebla (city)